Hundred Swords is a real-time strategy video game developed by Smilebit and published
by Sega in Japan for the Dreamcast and on the PC in the US by Activision. The PC release was compatible with Windows 95, 98, and Me.

Gameplay
The game was described by IGN as an "overtly western-style real-time strategy game". Both the Dreamcast and Windows releases supported up to four player online play, and offline play in two modes: Adventure Mode and Mission Mode.

Development
The title was Smilebit's next game following the critical success of Jet Set Radio. Yoshio Sugiura, a freelance illustrator with a "unique western influence" was commissioned to design the game's characters and creatures.

Reception
On release, Famitsu magazine scored the Dreamcast version of the game a review score of 31 out of 40. 

Reviewing the PC release, Greg Kasavin of GameSpot scored the title 7.1 out of 10, writing that "its mechanics are simplistic, its controls can be cumbersome, and the pathfinding for the game's units is dreadful", but praising its story as an "epic tale that creates a really great context for the gameplay" arguing that it "effectively draws you into its fantasy world during the cutscenes between battles".

References

External links
Hundred Swords at MobyGames

2001 video games
Dreamcast games
Fantasy video games
Real-time strategy video games
Smilebit games
Video games developed in Japan
Windows games